The canton of La Presqu'île is an administrative division of the Gironde department, southwestern France. It was created at the French canton reorganisation which came into effect in March 2015. Its seat is in Ambarès-et-Lagrave.

It consists of the following communes:
 
Ambarès-et-Lagrave
Ambès
Beychac-et-Caillau
Carbon-Blanc
Sainte-Eulalie
Saint-Loubès
Saint-Louis-de-Montferrand
Saint-Sulpice-et-Cameyrac
Saint-Vincent-de-Paul

References

Cantons of Gironde